The META is a 32-bit multithreaded microprocessor developed by  Metagence Technologies Division from Imagination Technologies. First version of META were developed in 2001 as META-1 multithreaded DSP core aimed for audio, radio and video processing.  META HTP core family was announced in 2007 and is based on META-2 architecture.

META family consists of Meta HTP applications processors (400–700 MHz on 65L 65G process), META MTP Embedded Processors and Meta LTP Embedded Microcontrollers.

It is supported by the Linux kernel as of version 3.9.

In 2018 March, LWN.net reported that Imagination Technologies redirected its focus away from Meta after its purchase of MIPS Technologies in 2012.  This has led to a proposal on Linux development mailing lists to remove support for the architecture from the kernel which became effective with the release of Linux 4.17 in June 2018.

References

External links
 Product Description  on Imagination Technologies website
 

Digital signal processors